Mantan Messes Up is a film produced in 1946 in the United States. It stars Mantan Moreland. Sam Newfield directed. The film was produced by Lucky Star Production Company. It was advertised as having an "All Colored Cast". The Museum of the Moving Image has a still from the film.

Appearances in the film by Lena Horne and Nina Mae McKinney may have been clipped from am earlier film released by Toddy Pictures.

Cast
Mantan Moreland as Office boy 
Monte Hawley as Office manager, Mr. Hawley
Jo Rhetta as Secretary
Doryce Bradley as Dancer
Lola Carrington as Wife
Raymond Harris
Lena Horne
Eddie Green
Buck and Bubbles
Nina Mae McKinney
Red Caps
Neva Peoples
Bo Jinkins
Four Tones

References

1946 films
Films directed by Sam Newfield
American musical comedy films
1940s American films